Joseph Little may refer to:

 Joseph J. Little (1841–1913), U.S. Representative from New York
 Joseph Ignatius Little (1835–1902), lawyer, politician, and judge in the Newfoundland Colony
 Jack Little (footballer) (1885–1965), born Joseph Little, English football full back for Crystal Palace
 Joe Little (1902–1965), English football outside left for Plymouth Argyle, Darlington, Bradford Park Avenue and Rotherham United
 Joe N Little III, American singer and musician best known as the lead singer of 1990s R&B/New jack swing group The Rude Boys